Axminster Museum is a town museum situated in the Old Police Station and Courthouse opposite St. Mary's Church in the centre of the town of Axminster, Devon, England. It was founded in 1982.

The Old Court House was built in the 1860s on the site of the old workhouse. The two-storey stone building has five bays with three asymmetrical gables. The current main doorway was a carriage entrance. The building is a Grade II listed building.

The collections include exhibits related to the town's carpet industry founded by Thomas Whitty in 1755. There are also agricultural tools, archaeological finds, Coins and Medals, Costumes and Textiles, old photographs, archives and occasional special exhibitions. It is also possible to see the old police cells and courtroom.

In 2015 a grant of £69,700 was obtained from the Heritage Lottery Fund for the development of the museum and the nearby Thomas Whitty House as a heritage centre. The heritage centre opened in 2016 and many of the exhibits from the museum were moved into the new centre, based in the old carpet factory.  It is hoped to obtain further funding for the renovation of the Drill Hall and Dye House.

The building also houses the town's tourist information centre.

References

External links
 Axminster Heritage

Local museums in Devon
Museums established in 1982
1982 establishments in England
Axminster